Valéry Mézague (8 December 198315 November 2014) was a Cameroonian professional footballer who played as a midfielder.

A French-born player, Mézague represented Cameroon at international level. His most notable moment with the Lions Indomptables was at the 2003 FIFA Confederations Cup, where he became the starter central midfielder in the lost final against host France, after replacing the late Marc-Vivien Foé during the victorious semi final versus Colombia.

In 2003, he was involved in a serious car crash which ruled him out of the game for four months. Despite this, he fought back to reclaim his form and his performances attracted the attention of Harry Redknapp, with Mézague joining Portsmouth F.C. on loan for the 2004–05 season. However, he failed to make any sort of substantial impression and returned to France in June 2005, where he followed his former manager at Portsmouth Alain Perrin to FC Sochaux-Montbéliard.

His younger brother, Teddy, is also a footballer.

He was found dead in his apartment on 15 November 2014, due to a cardiac arrest caused by a heart disease.

References

External links
 
 
 

1983 births
2014 deaths
Cameroonian footballers
French footballers
Cameroon international footballers
Cameroonian expatriate footballers
Cameroonian expatriate sportspeople in England
Footballers from Marseille
2003 FIFA Confederations Cup players
2004 African Cup of Nations players
Montpellier HSC players
Portsmouth F.C. players
FC Sochaux-Montbéliard players
Le Havre AC players
LB Châteauroux players
Panetolikos F.C. players
French sportspeople of Cameroonian descent
Citizens of Cameroon through descent
Premier League players
Ligue 1 players
Vannes OC players
Ligue 2 players
Bury F.C. players
English Football League players
Expatriate footballers in England
Association football midfielders